is a Japanese boccia player. He has represented Japan since 2010 and in the Summer Paralympics since 2012.

At the 2016 Summer Paralympics, he won a silver medal in the team BC1–2 event. At the 2020 Summer Paralympics, he won the gold medal in the individual BC1 event and a bronze medal at the mixed team event.

References 

1982 births
Living people
Sportspeople from Shizuoka Prefecture
Paralympic medalists in boccia
Boccia players at the 2012 Summer Paralympics
Boccia players at the 2016 Summer Paralympics
Boccia players at the 2020 Summer Paralympics
Medalists at the 2016 Summer Paralympics
Medalists at the 2020 Summer Paralympics
Paralympic boccia players of Japan
Paralympic gold medalists for Japan
Paralympic silver medalists for Japan
Paralympic bronze medalists for Japan